Taieb Ghafes also Taib Ghafess/Rhafes/Tayeb Rhafes (born 23 December 1940, Touissit) is a Moroccan politician of the National Rally of Independents party. He held the position of Minister of Fishery in the cabinet of Driss Jettou.

Ghafes holds a Ph.D in economics and has published a number of books about the economy of Morocco. He also worked in the banking sector since the 1970s.

See also
Cabinet of Morocco

References

Government ministers of Morocco
1940 births
Living people
Moroccan economists
Moroccan bankers
Members of the House of Representatives (Morocco)
National Rally of Independents politicians
Moroccan educators
People from Touissit